Dame Joan Margaret Higgins, DBE FAcSS is a British academic, educator, and public health service manager.

Career 
Higgins graduated in social administration from the University of York in 1971 and has held academic posts at the University of Portsmouth, University of Southampton (where she was professor of social policy) and University of Manchester (where she was professor of health policy, from 1992, and director of the Manchester Centre for Healthcare Management 1998–2004). In 2002–03 she was president of the European Health Management Association. Her roles include:
Chair of the NHS Litigation Authority, 2007–2013
Member (since 2005) of the QC Appointments Panel
Chair, Federal Working Group The Prince's Foundation for Integrated Health on complementary therapy
Chair (since 2001), Patient Information Advisory Group (PIAG) in the Department of Health
Chair, Ethics Advisory Group, NHS Care Record Development Board
Chair, Christie NHS Trust, 2002–2007  
Chair, NHS regional office for the North West
Chair, Manchester Health Authority

Awards
Honorary fellow of the Faculty of Public Health Medicine
Honorary fellow of the Institute of Health Record Information and Management 
Emerita professor of health policy at the University of Manchester

Damehood
In 2007, she was created a Dame Commander of the Order of the British Empire (DBE).

References

External links
BBC article
Telegraph article

Academics of the Victoria University of Manchester
Academics of the University of Portsmouth
Academics of the University of Southampton
Dames Commander of the Order of the British Empire
Living people
Place of birth missing (living people)
Year of birth missing (living people)
Alumni of the University of York
Fellows of the Academy of Social Sciences